The Satanic Verses are words of "satanic suggestion" which the Islamic prophet Muhammad is alleged to have mistaken for divine revelation. The first use of the expression in English is attributed to Sir William Muir in 1858.

The incident is accepted as true by some modern scholars of Islamic studies, under the criterion of embarrassment, citing the implausibility of early Muslim biographers fabricating a story so unflattering about their prophet. However others disagree, Alford T. Welch, in the Encyclopaedia of Islam, argues that the "implausibility" argument alone is insufficient to guarantee the tradition's authenticity. He says that the story in its present form is certainly a later, exegetical fabrication despite the fact that there could be some historical basis for the story. The story was accepted by religious authorities for the first two centuries of the Islamic era, but was later rejected by religious scholars (Ulama) from the 13th century onward as incompatible with Muhammad's "perfection", implying that Muhammad is infallible and therefore cannot be fooled by Satan.

Basic narrative

There are numerous accounts of the incident, which differ in the construction and detail of the narrative, but they may be broadly collated to produce a basic account. The different versions of the story are recorded in early tafsirs (Quranic commentaries) and biographies of the Prophet, such as Ibn Ishaq's. In its essential form, the story reports that Muhammad longed to convert his kinsmen and neighbors of Mecca to Islam. As he was reciting these verses of Sūrat an-Najm, considered a revelation from the angel Gabriel:

Satan tempted him to utter the following line:

Al-Lāt, al-'Uzzā, and Manāt were three pre-Islamic Arabian goddesses worshipped by the Meccans. Discerning the precise meaning of the word  has proven difficult, as it is a hapax legomenon (i.e. used only once in the text). Commentators wrote that it meant "the cranes". Taken as a segment, "exalted " has been translated by Orientalist William Muir to mean "exalted women", while contemporary academic Muhammad Manazir Ahsan has translated the same segment as "high-soaring ones (deities)". Thus, whether the phrase had intended to attribute a divine nature to the three "idols" is a matter of dispute. In either case, scholars generally agree on the meaning of the second half of the verse, "whose intercession is hoped for".

Tabarī's account

Reception in Muslim exegesis

Early Islam
Shahab Ahmed, author of a book on the satanic verses in early Islam, observed that in the era of early tafsirs and sīrah/maghazi literature, the satanic verses incident was near universally accepted by the early Muslim community and illustrative of a concept of prophethood involving an ongoing struggle. Later, the logic of the era of hadith collections and subsequent orthodoxy required an infallible prophet.

According to Ibn Taymiyyah: "The early Islamic Scholars (Salaf) collectively considered the Verses of Cranes in accordance with Quran. And from the later coming scholars (Khalaf), who followed the opinion of the early scholars, they say that these traditions have been recorded with authentic chain of narration and it is impossible to deny them, and Quran is itself testifying it."

The earliest biography of Muhammad, Ibn Ishaq (761–767) is lost but his collection of traditions survives mainly in two sources: Ibn Hisham (833) and al-Tabari (915). The story appears in al-Tabari, who includes Ibn Ishaq in the chain of transmission, but not in Ibn Hisham, who admits in the preface of his text that he omitted matters from Ibn Ishaq's biography that "would distress certain people". Ibn Sa'd and Al-Waqidi, two other early biographers of Muhammad relate the story. Scholars such as Uri Rubin and Shahab Ahmed and Guillaume hold that the report was in Ibn Ishaq, while Alford T. Welch holds the report has not been presumably present in the Ibn Ishaq.
Shahab Ahmed states that "Reports of the Satanic verses incident were recorded by virtually every compiler of a major biography of Muhammad in the first two centuries of Islam: 'Urwah b. al-Zubayr (23–94), Ibn Shihab al-Zuhri (51–124), Musa b. 'Uqbah (85–141), Ibn Ishaq (85–151), Abu Ma'shar (d. 170), Yunus b. Bukayr (d. 199), and al-Waqidi (130–207)."

Later medieval period
Due to its controversial nature, the tradition of the Satanic Verses never made it into any of the canonical hadith compilations (though possible truncated versions of the incident did). The reference and exegesis about the Verses appear in early histories.

Objections to the incident were raised as early as the fourth Islamic century, such as in the work of an-Nahhās and continued to be raised throughout later generations by scholars such as Abu Bakr ibn al-‘Arabi (d. 1157), Fakhr ad-Din Razi (1220) as well as al-Qurtubi (1285). The most comprehensive argument presented against the factuality of the incident came in Qadi Iyad's . The incident was discounted on two main bases. The second was that the descriptions of the chain of transmission extant since that period are not complete and sound.

However, Uri Rubin asserts that there exists a complete version of the isnad continuing to the companion Ibn 'Abbās, but this only survives in a few sources. He claims that in another form of the isnad the name of Ibn 'Abbās was removed so that the incident could be deprived of its  and discredited. Rubin makes similar comments about an isnad involving another companion, Makhrama bin Nawfal. 

Another modern academic scholar, Shahab Ahmed, carefully examined 50 riwayahs (transmissions) of the hadith narrated from the companion Ibn 'Abbās, and successors (tabi'un) including Muhammad bin ka'b Al-Qurazi, Sa'id b. Jubayr, 'Urwah b. al-Zubayr, Qatada b. Di'amah, Abu Bakr 'Abd al-Rahman b. al-Harith, al-Hasan al-Basri, and Mujahid b. Jabr. He notes that many of these are sahih mursal (i.e. sound except that the chain of narration ends at the successor instead of a companion of the prophet). He also discusses some narrations whose chains go back to Ibn 'Abbās, including one (riwayah 40 in Ahmed's book) which was considered reliable by some scholars, though al-Albani rejected it due to limited biographical information on one of the transmitters, and a similar one (riwayah 41) which Ahmed describes as "an equally - if not more - reliable isnād that has apparently gone unnoticed by later commentators". This, he says, has an "immaculate isnād" and lacks the deficiency noted by al-Albani. Ahmed states that "all the first and early second century reports are agreed that the Prophet uttered the satanic verses".

Imam Fakhr al-Din al-Razi commenting on Quran 22:52 in his Tafsir al-Kabir stated that the "people of verification" declared the story as an outright fabrication, citing supporting arguments from the Qur'an, Sunnah and reason. He then reported that the preeminent Muhaddith Ibn Khuzaymah said: "it is an invention of the heretics" when once asked about it. Al-Razi also recorded that al-Bayhaqi stated that the narration of the story was unreliable because its narrators were of questionable integrity.

Those scholars who acknowledged the historicity of the incident apparently had a different method for the assessment of reports than that which has become standard Islamic methodology. For example, Ibn Taymiyyah took the position that since  and  reports were commonly transmitted by incomplete , these reports should not be assessed according to the completeness of the chains but rather on the basis of recurrent transmission of common meaning between reports.

Al-Qurtubi dismisses all these variants in favor of the explanation that once Sūra al-Najm was safely revealed the basic events of the incident (or rumors of them) "were now permitted to occur to identify those of his followers who would accept Muhammad's explanation of the blasphemous imposture" (JSS 15, pp. 254–255).

Ibn Hajar al-Asqallani wrote:

Modern Islamic scholarship
While the authors of the  texts during the first two centuries of the Islamic era do not seem to have regarded the tradition as in any way inauspicious or unflattering to Muhammad, it seems to have been universally rejected by at least the 13th century, and most modern Muslims likewise see the tradition as problematic, in the sense that it is viewed as "profoundly heretical because, by allowing for the intercession of the three pagan female deities, they eroded the authority and omnipotence of Allah. But they also hold... damaging implications in regard to the revelation as a whole, for Muhammad's revelation appears to have been based on his desire to soften the threat to the deities of the people." Different responses have developed concerning the account.

Many modern Muslim scholars have rejected the story.
Arguments for rejection are found in Muhammad Abduh's article "Masʾalat al-gharānīq wa-tafsīr al-āyāt", Muhammad Husayn Haykal's "Hayat Muhammad", Sayyid Qutb's "Fi Zilal al-Quran" (1965), Abul Ala Maududi's "Tafhim-ul-Quran" (1972) and Muhammad Nasiruddin al-Albani's "Nasb al-majānīq li-nasf al-gharānīq".

Haykal points out the many forms and versions of the story and their inconsistencies and argues that "the contextual flow of Surah 'al Najm' does not allow at all the inclusion of such verses as the story claims". Haykal quotes Muhammad Abduh who pointed out that the "Arabs have nowhere described their gods in such terms as 'al gharaniq'. Neither in their poetry nor in their speeches or traditions do we find their gods or goddesses described in such terms. Rather, the word 'al ghurnuq' or 'al gharniq' was the name of a black or white water bird, sometimes given figuratively to the handsome blond youth." Lastly, Haykal argues that the story is inconsistent with Muhammad's personal life and is completely against the spirit of the Islamic message.

Aqa Mahdi Puya has said that these fake verses were shouted out by the Meccans to make it appear that it was Muhammad who had spoken them; he writes:

This entire matter was a mere footnote to the back-and-forth of religious debate, and was rekindled only when Salman Rushdie's 1988 novel, The Satanic Verses, made headline news. The novel contains some fictionalized allusions to Islamic history, which provoked both controversy and outrage. Muslims around the world protested the book's publishing, and Iran's Ayatollah Khomeini issued a fatwa sentencing Rushdie to death, saying that the book blasphemed Muhammad and his wives.

Historicity debate
Since William Muir, the historicity of this episode has been largely accepted by secular academics. Some orientalists, however, argued against the historic authenticity of these verses on various grounds. Sean Anthony observes a trend of more recent scholarship towards rejecting the historicity of the story after a period in which scholars were more divided.

William Montgomery Watt and Alfred Guillaume claim that stories of the event were true based upon the implausibility of Muslims fabricating a story so unflattering to their prophet: "Muhammad must have publicly recited the satanic verses as part of the Qur'ān; it is unthinkable that the story could have been invented by Muslims, or foisted upon them by non-Muslims." Trude Ehlert, in the Encyclopaedia of Islam, finds Watt's reason to be insufficient, stating "The story in its present form (as related by al-Ṭabarī, al-Wāḳidī, and Ibn Saʿd) cannot be accepted as historical for a variety of reasons".

Regarding this argument, Shahab Ahmed in the Encyclopaedia of the Qur'ān counters that "the widespread acceptance of the incident by early Muslims suggests, however, that they did not view the incident as inauspicious and that they would presumably not have, on this basis at least, been adverse to inventing it." 
Similarly, Alford T. Welch, in the Encyclopaedia of Islam, argues that the "implausibility" argument alone is insufficient to guarantee the tradition's authenticity. He says that the story in its present form is certainly a later, exegetical fabrication despite the fact that there could be some historical basis for the story.

Welch states that the story falsely claims that the chapter 53:1–20 and the end of the chapter are a unity. He also states that the date for the verse 22:52 is later than 53:21–27 and almost certainly belongs to the Medinan period. Several other details in certain narrations of the story, such as the mosque and the sajda, do not belong to the Meccan phase of Muhammad's career. Welch also claims that the story was not mentioned in Ibn Ishaq's biography of Muhammad. He says that the above analysis does not rule out "the possibility of some historical kernel behind the story." One such possibility, Welch says, is that the story is of a historical telescoping nature: "that a situation that was known by Muhammad's contemporaries to have lasted for a long period of time later came to be encapsulated in a story that restricts his acceptance of intercession through these goddesses to a brief period of time and places the responsibility for this departure from a strict monotheism on Satan."

John Burton argued for its fictitiousness based upon a demonstration of its actual utility to certain elements of the Muslim community – namely, those legal exegetes seeking an "occasion of revelation" for eradicative modes of abrogation. Burton supports his theory by the fact that Tabari does not discuss the story in his exegesis of the verse 53:20, but rather in 22:52. Disagreeing with Burton, G.R. Hawting writes that the satanic verses incident would not serve to justify or exemplify a theory that God reveals something and later replaces it himself with another true revelation.

Maxime Rodinson finds that it may reasonably be accepted as true "because the makers of Muslim tradition would never have invented a story with such damaging implications for the revelation as a whole." He writes the following on the genesis of the verses: "Obviously Muhammad's unconscious had suggested to him a formula which provided a practical road to unanimity." Rodinson writes that this concession, however, diminished the threat of the Last Judgment by enabling the three goddesses to intercede for sinners and save them from eternal damnation. Further, it diminished Muhammad's own authority by giving the priests of Uzza, Manat, and Allat the ability to pronounce oracles contradicting his message. Disparagement from Christians and Jews, who pointed out that he was reverting to his pagan beginnings, combined with opposition and indignation from his own followers influenced him to recant his revelation. However, in doing so he denounced the gods of Mecca as lesser spirits or mere names, cast off everything related to the traditional religion as the work of pagans and unbelievers, and consigned the Meccan's pious ancestors and relatives to Hell. This was the final break with the Quraysh.

Fred Halliday states that rather than having damaging implications, the story is a cautionary tale, the point of which is "not to malign God but to point up the frailty of human beings," and that even a prophet may be misled by shaytan – though ultimately shaytan is unsuccessful.

Since John Wansbrough's contributions to the field in the early 1970s, though, scholars have become much more attentive to the emergent nature of early Islam, and less willing to accept back-projected claims of continuity:

In Rubin's recent contribution to the debate, questions of historicity are completely eschewed in favor of an examination of internal textual dynamics and what they reveal about early medieval Islam. Rubin claims to have located the genesis of many prophetic traditions and that they show an early Muslim desire to prove to other scriptuaries "that Muhammad did indeed belong to the same exclusive predestined chain of prophets in whom the Jews and the Christians believed. He alleges that the Muslims had to establish the story of Muhammad's life on the same literary patterns as were used in the vitae of the other prophets". The incident of the Satanic Verses, according to him, conforms to the common theme of persecution followed by isolation of the prophet-figure.

As the story was adapted to include Qur'ānic material (Q.22:52, Q.53, Q.17:73–74), the idea of satanic temptation was claimed to have been added, heightening its inherent drama as well as incorporating additional Biblical motifs (cf. the Temptation of Christ). Rubin gives his attention to the narratological exigencies which may have shaped early  material, as opposed to the more commonly considered ones of dogma, sect, and political/dynastic faction. Given the consensus that "the most archaic layer of the biography, [is] that of the stories of the  [i.e. popular story-tellers]" (EI²), this may prove a fruitful line of inquiry.

Rubin also claimed that the supposed temporary control taken by Satan over Muhammad made such traditions unacceptable to early hadith compilers, which he believed to be a unique case in which a group of traditions are rejected only after being subject to Qur'anic models, and as a direct result of this adjustment.

Building on Rubin's views, Sean Anthony has proposed that an early tradition attributed to ʿUrwa b. al-Zubayr about the mass conversion and prostration of the Meccans but which does not mention the satanic verses was at a later stage connected with Q. 53:19-20, Q. 22:52 and Q. 17:73-74.

Some scholars believe there is evidence in the Quranic text of surah 53 itself relevant to the question of historicity. Nicolai Sinai argues that the conciliatory satanic verses would make no sense in the context of the scathing criticism in the subsequent verses, whether they were uttered before Q.53:21-22 or (if those replaced the satanic verses) Q. 53:24-25. Patricia Crone makes a similar point but regarding the preceding verses, Q. 53:19-20. She argues that "Have you seen al-Lat...?" should be taken as a hostile question about literally seeing the three deities, particularly since the preceding half of the surah repeatedly claims that Allah's servant saw the heavenly being, and noting also other verses where a similar question is asked (Q. 35:40 and Q. 46:4).

On the other hand, Tommaso Tesei builds on the common observation (also mentioned by Crone) that verses 23 and 26-32 of Q. 53 appear to be an interpolation of long verses into a surah of otherwise short verses. Tesei argues that those verses display stylistic incoherence as well as a theological tension with the rest of Q. 53, a surah which is consistent with evidence external to the Islamic tradition regarding pre-Islamic deities and star worship. Of relevance to the possibility of historical elements in the satanic verses story, Tesei notes that the interpolation (as he sees it) coincides exactly with the traditional account that an explanatory comment was inserted to rectify the identification of the pagan deities as divine intercessors.

Shahab Ahmed noted that the Quran is at pains to deny that the source of Muhammad's inspiration is a shaytan (Q. 81:19–20, 25) because for his immediate audience, the sources for the two categories of inspired individuals in society, poets and soothsayers, were shaytans and jinn, respectively, whereas Muhammad was a prophet.

Related traditions
Several related traditions exist, some adapted to Qur'ānic material, some not. One version, appearing in Tabarī's  and attributed to Urwah ibn Zubayr (d. 713), preserves the basic narrative but with no mention of satanic temptation. Muhammad is persecuted by the Meccans after attacking their idols, during which time a group of Muslims seeks refuge in Abyssinia. After the cessation of this first round of persecution they return home, but soon a second round begins. No compelling reason is provided for the caesura of persecution, though, unlike in the incident of the satanic verses, where it is the (temporary) fruit of Muhammad's accommodation to Meccan polytheism.

The image of Muslims and pagans prostrating themselves together in prayer in turn links the story of the satanic verses to very abbreviated  (i.e. prostration when reciting the Qur'ān) traditions found in the authoritative  collections, including the Sunni canonical ones of Bukhāri and Tirmidhī. Rubin claims that apparently "the allusion to the participation of the  emphasises how overwhelming and intense the effect of this  was on those attending". The traditions actually state that all cognizant creatures took part in it, humans as well as jinns.

Rubin further argues that this is inherently illogical without the Satanic Verses in the recitation, given that in the accepted version of verses Q.53:19–23, the pagans' goddesses are attacked. Some traditions even describe his eventual comeuppance, saying he is later killed at the battle of Badr. Thus, according to Rubin, "the story of the single polytheist who raised a handful of dirt to his forehead… [in]… attempt of an old disabled man to participate in Muhammad's … in… a sarcastic act of an enemy of Muhammad wishing to dishonor the Islamic prayer". And "traditions which originally related the dramatic story of temptation became a sterilized anecdote providing prophetic precedent for a ritual practice".

See also
Allah as a lunar deity
Criticism of the Quran
Demolition of al-Lat
Demolition of al-Uzza
Demolition of Manat
Sirat Rasul Allah, one name for any traditional Muslim prophetic biography of Muhammad

Notes

References

External links

Commentators
"Those Are The High Flying Claims" (Refutation of the Christian missionary writings on the so-called "Satanic verses")
The "Satanic Verses" story was never taken seriously by Islamic scholars
Muhammad: The man and the message

STORY OF THE CRANES or "SATANIC VERSES"

Quranic verses
Criticism of Islam
Islam-related controversies
Satan
Al-Lat